

Mayoral & Vice Mayoral Candidates
List of Candidates as of March 2010

Councilor Election
List of Candidates as of March 2010

Cavite City
2010 Philippine local elections
Elections in Cavite
2010 elections in Calabarzon